Ed Feder (12 September 1896 – 12 November 1968) was an  Australian rules footballer who played with Geelong in the Victorian Football League (VFL).

Notes

External links 

1896 births
1968 deaths
Australian rules footballers from Victoria (Australia)
Geelong Football Club players